Bleu pétrole  (Petrol blue) is the twelfth studio album by the French rocker Alain Bashung, released in March 2008 on Barclay Records. It was the last studio album released during his lifetime.

Production 
Great expectations surrounded Bleu pétrole after L'Imprudence, issued in 2002, and the live album La Tournée des grands espaces, issued in 2004. Bashung took time to work on it, before deciding finally to not work with his lyricist Jean Fauque, choosing instead to work with Gaëtan Roussel of Louise Attaque and Gérard Manset. After the more experimental works of the 2000s, Bashung decided to go back to a more traditional rock-sounding album, closer to his works of the 1990s.
 
The album is dedicated to Mick Larie, a member of Bluegrass Long Distance, who died in July 2007, the mandoline player and friend of Marcel Dadi and Patrick Sébastien. The first single from the album was "Résidents de la République" ("Residents of the Republic").

Bashung began touring to promote the album and sang "Comme un lego" ("Like a lego") by Gérard Manset as the opener of his concerts. On 7 July 2008, an expanded vinyl collector edition of 1,000 copies was issued.

Bleu pétrole was Bashung's last studio album;, who died on 14 March 2009.

Reception

Critical reception 

In 2010, the French edition of Rolling Stone magazine named this album the 46th greatest French rock album (out of 100).

The French magazine Les Inrockuptibles called the album an "immense chef-d'œuvre" (a huge masterpiece).

Track listing

Personnel

Musicians 
 Alain Bashung - vocals
 Gaëtan Roussel - acoustic guitar, electric guitar, ukulele
 Marc Ribot - electric guitar, banjo
 Arman Méliès - electric guitar, banjo
 Mark Plati - bass guitar, guitars, keyboard, drum machine
 Simon Edwards - bass guitar
 Shawn Pelton - drums
 Martyn Barker - drums, bongo
 Tahar Boukhlifa - drums
 M. Ward - electric guitar, acoustic guitar
 String section :
 Violins - Marian Tache, Erik Sluys, Dick Uten, Bart Lemmens, Tatjana Scleck, Christophe Pochet, Cristina Constantinescu, Annelies Broeckhoven
 Viola - François Grietje
 Cellos - Hans Vandaele, Karel Steylaerts
 Strings direction - Mark Steylaerts

Production 
 Jérôme Witz, element-s: cover art and graphisms
 Ludovic Carême: photos

Charts

Weekly charts

Year-end charts

Certifications

References 

2008 albums
Barclay (record label) albums
Alain Bashung albums
albums produced by Mark Plati